K. T. George was a lawyer and politician from Kerala, India. He represented Paravur Assembly constituency as an Indian National Congress representative in the third and fourth Kerala Legislative Assemblies.

Biography 
Born July 20, 1929, K. T. George was survived by his wife, Saramma George. The couple had three daughters. He was a lawyer by profession.

While speaking in the Kerala Legislative Assembly as the Law Minister, on March 4, 1972, he collapsed and died soon after.

Political career 
George, who was a criminal lawyer from Paravur, entered public service in 1954 as an active member of the Indian National Congress. Later he was selected member of Kerala Pradesh Congress Committee and All India Congress Committee. He was first elected from Paravur in 1965. However no single party could form a ministry commanding majority and hence this election was considered abortive. On March 25, President's rule was invoked in the state for the fourth time. He later won the 1967 elections from Paravur and became a member of the Third Kerala Legislative Assembly. During this period he was also served as the Chief Whip of the Congress Legislative Party. He again won the 1970 elections from Paravur. During this period he was the Chairman of the Estimates Committee from 1970 to 1971 and the Deputy Leader of the Congress Legislative Party.

From September 25, 1971, till his death he served as the Kerala state Minister for finance and Minister of Law.

References

External links 

 Official obituary reference of the Kerala Legislative Assembly

1929 births
1972 deaths
Indian National Congress politicians from Kerala
Malayali politicians
Kerala MLAs 1970–1977
Kerala MLAs 1967–1970